Neighbours is an Australian television soap opera created by Reg Watson. It was first broadcast on 18 March 1985. The following is a list of characters that first appeared in the serial in 1994, by order of first appearance. Until 9 May, characters were introduced by the soap's executive producer, Alan Coleman. Thereafter, they were introduced by his successor, Stanley Walsh. The 10th season of Neighbours began airing from 20 January 1994. Frank Bren began appearing as Colin Taylor in same month. Bren also played Colin's twin brother Alf. March saw the arrivals of Len Mangel, Sally Pritchard and Stonefish Rebecchi. Katerina Torelli made her first appearance in April, followed by Andrew MacKenzie in May. Sam Kratz was introduced in June and his grandmother Marlene Kratz began appearing in July. That month also saw the births of Louise Carpenter and Zac Willis. Serendipity Gottlieb made her debut in August. Stonefish's brother Shane Rebecchi arrived in September. He was followed by the first two members of the Kennedy family: doctor Karl Kennedy and his youngest son Billy. Karl's wife Susan and their elder children Malcolm and Libby followed in October. November saw Bianca Zanotti and Ling Mai Chan make their debut appearances.

Colin Taylor

Colin Taylor, played by Frank Bren, made his first appearance on 27 January 1994. The character was described as an "incurable chatterbox" and "irritating as hell" by a writer for Inside Soap. Writers later paired Colin with established character Marlene Kratz (Moya O'Sullivan). O'Sullivan said the pair "seem to hit it off in a big way" and that it was "definitely love". Marlene and Colin share similar interests and O'Sullivan thought it was nice that Marlene had someone of her own that cared for her.

Colin introduces himself to Philip (Ian Rawlings) and Julie Martin (Julie Mullins) when they arrive at their holiday bungalow in Queensland. The Martins find Colin friendly, but his tendency to ramble irritates them. Colin reappears several months later as Doug Willis's (Terence Donovan) roommate at the hospital. Colin takes a job at Philip's newsagency and competes against Karl Kennedy (Alan Fletcher) at the auction for Number 28 Ramsay Street but ultimately loses out. Colin makes several changes to the newsagency, and he forms a Barbershop Trio with Philip and Vikram Chatterji (Nigel Rodrigues). Colin moves into Number 30 with Mark Gottlieb (Bruce Samazan) and Cody Willis (Peta Brady). Colin's twin brother Alf (also Bren) comes to visit him. When Colin pursues a relationship with Marlene Kratz, he believes Alf is also trying to making advances towards her and they fight. Alf then admits that he is not interested in Marlene, as he is gay. Colin proposes to Marlene. They argue about what type of ceremony to have, as Marlene is Catholic and Colin wants a civil ceremony. Shortly after, Colin is offered a job as a translator by the curator of the Modern Ceramics exhibition, which is going on a world tour. Marlene ends their relationship, as she does not want to leave her family. Colin then leaves for Argentina, after his friends throw him a leaving party.

Colin received a nomination for Most Annoying Character at the 1996 Inside Soap Awards. Dave Lanning of The People was not a fan of the Colin/Marlene pairing, commenting that the writers must have been on magic mushrooms when they came up with the storyline. He stated, "Moonie Marlene, who had an invisible cat and disappearing garden gnomes, is being wooed by the terminally boring Colin Taylor, who always appeared in a straw boater originally; pioneered barber shop quartets, and is back from China – banging a gong and muttering in Mandarin. You honestly wouldn't script it." Matthew Clifton, writing for HecklerSpray, included the character in his feature on the "Best Ever Mid-90s Neighbours Characters". Clifton said, "Colin was pompous and irritating, a pastiche of a middle class bore who looked a lot like a paedophile. Colin actor Frank Bren also played his identical twin Alf, the more go-getting, handsome one, who turned out to be gay."

Len Mangel

Leonard G. "Len" Mangel, played by John Lee, made his first appearance on 16 March 1994. Len is Nell Mangel's (Vivean Gray) former husband, who was often mentioned during the early years of the programme, but never seen. He returns to Erinsborough "out of the blue" and romances Helen Daniels (Anne Haddy), as he wants to steal her widow's pension. An Inside Soap columnist branded Len an "evil conman", and commented, "Poor old Helen – it looks as if she's headed for a fall – again!"

Len is the former husband of Nell Mangel and father of Amanda Harris (Briony Behets) and Joe Mangel (Mark Little). After Len's granddaughter Jane (Annie Jones) suspects Nell has killed him, it is eventually revealed that Len has left Nell for another woman. Len files for divorce and wants to sell Number 32 Ramsay Street and split the proceeds between them. Nell refuses and blackmails Len by threatening to follow him wherever he goes if she should lose the house.

Seven years later, Len returns to Erinsborough after Michael Martin (Troy Beckwith) and Doug Willis (Terence Donovan) find some old war medals and a trombone case with the initials L.G.M inscribed on it, while renovating an old house. Len reveals he used to live in the house and the case and medals belong to him. He lets Michael keep all the medals except for the Flying Cross. Len then meets up with his former neighbour Helen Daniels, who he has not seen in many years and they reminisce about old times. Len mentions he had left Nell because of her incessant nagging and moved in with Mary Pengelly who turned out to be just as bad and faked his death to get away from her and planned to reappear to scare her, but Mary had died before Len had the chance. He also mentions he has since reconciled with Joe but Amanda will not forgive him for leaving Nell.  Helen is initially appalled at Len's justification for his actions but continues to see him, much to the chagrin of Julie (Julie Mullins), Helen's granddaughter.

Len attempts to con some money out of Helen by suggesting she invest in Outback Tours. Despite warnings from her family, Helen is undeterred. When Michael returns Len's jacket to an address on his driving license he meets Gwen Childs (Robyn Bissett), who warns him that Len is not to be trusted, as he conned her into putting her money into a joint account and emptied it. Gwen thinks Len may do the same to Helen. Michael warns Helen, who continues not to listen, so he and his sister, Debbie (Marnie Reece-Wilmore), set a trap for Len. When Len is caught, he tries to explain himself to Helen, and she sends him packing.

A writer for BBC Online, which hosted an official Neighbours website, said Len's most notable moment was "Trying to scam money out of Helen by trying to get her to invest in a dodgy business called Outback Tours." Len was also included in the BBC's list of twenty favourite obscure Neighbours characters to help celebrate the show's 20th anniversary. Len's off-screen presence and the reason why viewers did not get to see him were noted. In her book The Neighbours Programme Guide, Josephine Monroe commented "Poor old Len Mangel was so henpecked by his witch of a wife Nell that he never dared show his face in Ramsay Street!"

Sally Pritchard

Sally Pritchard, played by singer Brenda Webb, made her first appearance on 23 March 1994. Pritchard's casting was announced in January 1994. Brett Thomas of The Sun-Herald reported that she was initially contracted for six weeks. Webb liked the short duration, as she wanted to concentrate on her music career. She stated, "I don't think I'd like to work any longer than six months on a soapie because I feel I'd get stale doing the one character; plus I want to move on to bigger and better things." Sally was introduced as Erinsborough High's new Japanese language teacher, and a friend of Gaby Willis (Rachel Blakely). Sally's student Rick Alessi (Dan Falzon) develops a crush on her, and they soon begin a romantic relationship.

Sally's friend Gaby Willis helps her get a job teaching Japanese at Erinsborough High. Gaby also introduces Sally to Rick Alessi, a student at the school. He develops a crush on Sally and decides to take Japanese as an extra subject. Sally develops feelings for Rick, but assures him that nothing can happen as she is his teacher. Rick makes the decision to leave school and becomes a bar man at The Waterhole. He uses his salary to buy an engagement ring and proposes to Sally. She tells him it is too soon, but agrees to think about it. Sally talks to Gaby and her flatmate John Muir (Benjamin Grant) about Rick's proposal, and John advises her to break up with Rick. Sally later tells Gaby that she is scared at what Rick might do next, as he is not behaving very rationally. Sally asks Gaby to let Rick down gently on her behalf. John suggests that they pretend to be a couple to put Rick off. Sally accepts a job in Japan and before she leaves, she tells Rick that she cannot marry him, as she does not feel the same way as he does.

Stonefish Rebecchi

Kevin "Stonefish" Rebecchi, played by Anthony Engelman, made his first appearance on 31 March 1994. The character was introduced after a TV Week reporter revealed the show would be getting "a younger, livelier look" with some new characters under the age of eighteen. Engelman told an Inside Soap columnist that his first script said his character got his nickname because he looked like a stonefish. Another writer for the publication observed that Stonefish was happy when he was causing a stir in the classroom, and that he was likely to be involved wherever there was trouble. Stonefish arrives on Ramsay Street after hearing that Brett Stark (Brett Blewitt) is dating his girlfriend Sassy Patterson-Smythe (Defah Dattner). Engelman said he had a lot in common with his character, as he had a tough time at school too and did not have much luck with girls.

Katerina Torelli

Katerina "Katy" Torelli, played by Josephine Mitchell, made her first appearance on 18 April 1994. Mitchell was initially contracted for an eight-week guest stint. Mitchell was pleased to join another soap opera, having previously made appearances in A Country Practice and E Street. She also liked that Katerina was "such a positive character". Katerina has been disabled since birth and uses a wheelchair. Mitchell admitted that she found it hard acting in a wheelchair, and had to make it look as if she really was paralysed. During her research for the role, Mitchell turned to the Australian Paraquad Society for help. The actress thought the introduction of a disabled character was "just what the soap needs" and hoped it would get people talking about the issues raised. Katerina was introduced as a potential love interest for Mark Gottlieb (Bruce Samazan) and rival for Annalise Hartman (Kimberley Davies). Mitchell said Katerina thinks Mark is "very cute" and goes out of her way to make Annalise jealous. Kevin Sadlier of The Sydney Morning Herald reviewed Mitchell's first episode as Katerina as part of the paper's "Television This Week" feature. Sadlier wrote "Katerina first appears as a mystery woman waving to Mark Gottlieb from a passing car as if they are old friends, causing pangs of jealousy in Annalise. Actually they really are old friends – from E Street!"

When Katerina sees Mark Gottlieb out driving with Annalise Hartman, she immediately develops a crush on him. She starts phoning him using the alias "KT", causing Annalise to become jealous. Mark learns KT is actually Katerina, who explains that she is impressed with his fundraising for the Paralympics and wants to work with him. Katerina develops a crush on Mark, and starts dedicating songs to him on the radio. Mark warns her that he will not cheat on Annalise. After a night out with Mark's friends, Katerina makes a suggestive comment to Mark, who tells her again that he loves Annalise. But when Annalise goes away, Mark kisses Katerina. She tells Annalise that she and Mark are in love. Mark confronts Katerina, who insists that she is destined to be with him. Annalise and Mark realise they need to get away from Katerina's obsessive behaviour, so they leave for his parents' farm.

Andrew MacKenzie

Andrew "Macca" MacKenzie, played by John Morris, made his first appearance on 9 May 1994. Macca is the first gay character to be introduced to Neighbours. Morris felt it was a "bonus" for him to play Macca, explaining "It gave me exposure because he's a controversial character. I've never played a gay part in ten years as an actor, but let's face it, gay people are people. You don't try to be a gay person – put on a funny voice or wear a dress, you just are that person." Morris partly modelled the character on a friend who was gay and worked as a builder in Australia. He said that his friend was "built like a tank" and most people would assume he was straight. Macca is a council recreation officer and Doug Willis's (Terence Donovan) new boss. He is open and happy about his sexuality, though he is used to girls having crushes on him. Teenager Debbie Martin (Marnie Reece-Wilmore) falls for him after taking his photograph, forcing Macca to tell her he is gay. Morris was disappointed that the scriptwriters did not give Macca a love interest, saying "There's never any reference made to a man in Macca's life." He thought they should have gone further with his character's storyline, which he would not have minded playing out. Morris admitted that Macca's exit after 12 weeks came as a surprise, but having also appeared in Home and Away, he had no desire to stay in soaps long-term and wanted to continue working in television and theatre productions.

Andrew visits the site of Kia-Ora, an old house which is being renovated by Doug Willis. He finds Lou Carpenter (Tom Oliver) brewing beer inside and asks if Doug is about. Lou directs him Doug's way, where Andrew introduces himself as a recreation officer from the council and Doug's supervisor on the project. He explains that the place should be done in six months, as the council want to open it as a museum. He also says that Lou needs to get his brewery off the premises as it is council property. While Debbie Martin is taking photographs at Kia-Ora for a school assignment, she sees Andrew gardening and takes his photo. She tells Doug's daughter Cody Willis (Peta Brady) about how attractive Macca is, so Cody visits the site to see him for herself. Andrew interrupts Cody and Doug to ask about a wall that Doug knocked down. He asks for it to be put back as it is part of the original design, leading Cody to call him an arrogant pig. She asks him to show her father more respect. Debbie later returns to the site to ask Andrew if Cody is there. Andrew recognises her school uniform and tells her that the council have put him in charge of the centenary celebrations and he is going around the local schools to drum up some fundraising, so if she has any good ideas to let him know. Andrew apologises to Doug about the wall and compliments the work he has done. He asks whether the homebrew is ready to drink, but Doug says no, so they decide to go to the local pub instead and Andrew tells Doug to call him "Macca".

Debbie later tells Macca about her debutante ball idea for Erinsborough's centenary celebrations, which Macca says is fantastic. Debbie asks if he likes dancing and invites him to a Hawaiian luau event at The Waterhole that evening. Macca attends the luau and Andrew encourages Debbie and Cody to join him in the conga. Macca allows Doug and Lou to store their homebrew at Kia-Ora and even becomes involved in the brewing operation. Macca works with Debbie organising the debutante ball and her crush on him intensifies. He tries to put her off, but she tells him that he is the only one who understands her. Cody warns Macca about Debbie's infatuation with him, and Macca tells her that he does not know what else he can do without hurting Debbie. He suggests resigning from the ball committee, so he will not have to go to the school, but Cody says he cannot avoid Debbie forever. She also berates him for storing Doug and Lou's illicit alcohol. Macca rejects Debbie's romantic advances and eventually tells her he is gay. Debbie struggles with Macca's rejection and develops an eating disorder. At the Deb ball, Macca apologises for not telling Debbie the truth sooner and he tells her that he never meant to hurt her, which she accepts. Doug, Lou and Macca make a deal to sell their homebrew at The Waterhole. Macca tells Rick Alessi (Dan Falzon) that it is only for customers who know about it. Megan Levy (Michelle Twigden) comes to Doug's house wanting to buy some of the homebrew and he, Lou and Macca take her to Kia-Ora to sample some. Rick realises that Megan is an undercover police officer and tells Cody, who goes to Kia-Ora and stops her father from selling the alcohol to Megan.

Drew Grover
Drew Grover, played by Christopher Kirby made his first appearance on 9 June 1994. Kirby's casting was announced by Caron James from TV Week. An American citizen, Kirby was jobbing actor in Australia when he received the guest role. Drew was introduced as the secret husband of Cody Willis (Peta Brady), who she married during her time as an exchange student in the United States. Kirby told James that he believed the marriage story was credible, despite accusations that it was far-fetched. Drew's introduction into the series sees him arrive in Erinsborough. Cody reveals that Drew had slept with her friend causing her to return home. Kirby told Victoria Ross of Inside Soap that Drew married Cody so he could avoid paying tax on his family inheritance by transferring it into her name. He added that Cody "knew what she was getting into, but unfortunately she fell head over heels in love with him and was devastated when she found out that he was having an affair with her best friend." Cody's family are perturbed because Drew does not return the United States immediately. Drew soon requests a divorce because he believes a mixed race marriage might ruin his aspirations of a career in politics. He departed on 22 June 1994.

Sam Kratz

Sam Kratz, played by Richard Grieve, made his first appearance on 13 June 1994. Neighbours was Grieve's first major television role and he relocated from his native Sydney to Melbourne, where the studio is located. Of being cast in a soap, he said "I'm thrilled with the way things have gone. I was very nervous when I first started because it was a long-running job but it's turned out well." Sam is sent to Ramsay Street by his grandmother, Marlene (Moya O'Sullivan), to check out the house she has purchased. While he initially gets off to a rough start, Sam soon becomes a popular Ramsay Street resident. Grieve wanted to be more like his character. He said that he was more of a worrier than Sam, who he described as "friendly and laid-back". For his portrayal of Sam, Grieve earned a nomination for Most Popular Newcomer at the 1st National Television Awards in 1995.

Marlene Kratz

Marlene Kratz, played by Moya O'Sullivan, made her first appearance on 5 July 1994. She was introduced as the grandmother of Sam Kratz (Richard Grieve) and the estranged mother of Cheryl Stark (Caroline Gillmer). Josephine Monroe, author of Neighbours: the first 10 years, said Cheryl had "demonized her mother in her mind" and wanted nothing to do with her. Monroe described her as a bit scatty and always ready for a scam or a bet. Marlene also became a love interest for Colin Taylor (Frank Bren). A columnist for Inside Soap branded Marlene "the grooviest granny in Erinsborough, who throws herself into any worthy cause, and opens her house to every passing waif and stray." Alex Fletcher from Digital Spy made Marlene their "DS Icon" in January 2011. Fletcher stated that Marlene was "a crucial cog in the Golden Age of Neighbours in the '90s."

Louise Carpenter

Shannon Louise "Lolly" Allen (also Carpenter) made her first appearance on 25 July 1994. Louise was originally played by Tessa Taylor from her on-screen birth, with Jiordan Tolli taking over the role a few months later. Cheryl Stark (Caroline Gillmer) gives birth to Louise on the same day as Gaby Willis (Rachel Blakely) gives birth to her son Zac (Jay Callahan). Louise came to be more commonly known as "Lolly". She was presumed to be Lou Carpenter's (Tom Oliver) daughter, until her biological father John Allen (Adrian Mulraney) got in contact, after Cheryl's death. Tolli departed the cast in 2001. The character was reintroduced in 2006, with Adelaide Kane taking over the role, after winning the Dolly "Neighbours Next Big Stars" competition. For her portrayal of Lolly, Kane was nominated for the Logie Award for Most Popular New Female Talent in 2008.

Zac Willis

Shannon Zachary "Zac" Willis, played by Jay Callahan, was born on screen during the episode broadcast on 25 July 1994. Zac is the son of Gaby Willis (Rachel Blakely) and Jack Flynn (Mark Pennell). Blakely thought motherhood would be an eye opener for Gaby, saying "She thinks she can juggle work and home life and the baby will look after himself. She's going to get a real shock when she realises how difficult it's going to be to bring up a child."

Gaby becomes pregnant after a brief relationship with her flying instructor, Jack Flynn. Shortly after she announces her pregnancy, Cheryl Stark (Caroline Gillmer) also announces she is pregnant. Gaby gives birth to a healthy baby boy, while Cheryl gives birth to a daughter who is premature. Gaby names her son Shannon, but Cheryl also uses the name for her daughter. While registering the birth, Gaby's father Doug Willis (Terence Donovan) names his grandson Zachary, after his grandfather. Gaby is not happy, but realises she likes the shortened version of the name, Zac. Jack returns and says he wants to be a part of his son's life. When Gaby gets a job in Darwin, Jack decides to move there with her and Zac. Shortly before they leave, the Willis family hold a naming ceremony at Number 28 and Gaby plants a tree for Zac.

Josephine Monroe, author of Neighbours: The First 10 Years, commented that it was "in true Neighbours style" that both Gaby and Cheryl went into labour at the same time.

Serendipity Gottlieb

Serendipity "Ren" Gottlieb, played by Raelee Hill, made her first appearance on 25 August 1994. She was among several new characters under the age of eighteen to be introduced after a TV Week reporter revealed the show would be getting "a younger, livelier look". The show's casting director Jan Russ noticed Hill in a cafe, while she was on a break from filming Blue Heelers, and asked her to audition for the role. Serendipity is the younger sister of Stephen (Lochie Daddo) and Mark Gottlieb (Bruce Samazan). Unlike her brothers, she enjoyed living in the hippy communes with her parents when she was a child and retained her beliefs. She is described as "one of life's free spirits" and is ruled by her heart rather than her head. Serendipity was less conservative than the other Ramsay Street residents and she "brought a breath of fresh air" into Mark's life.

Shane Rebecchi

Shane Rebecchi, played by Greg O'Meara, made his first appearance on 8 September 1994. Shane is the elder brother of Stonefish (Anthony Engelman) and Toadfish Rebecchi (Ryan Moloney). The character departed in 1995, but was reintroduced to the regular cast in 2017, with Nicholas Coghlan taking over the role. Producers created a family for Shane and he returns to Erinsborough with his wife Dipi Rebecchi (Sharon Johal), daughters Yashvi Rebecchi (Olivia Junkeer) and Kirsha Rebecchi (Vani Dhir), and sister-in-law Mishti Sharma (Scarlet Vas). Executive producer Jason Herbison commented, "Shane Rebecchi is one of the great untapped characters from Neighbours history. I'm delighted to welcome him back to Ramsay Street along with his beautiful wife, two children and sister-in-law. It's a great new chapter of the Rebecchi family." Coghlan said that Shane comes to support Toadie during his "time of need", following his marriage breakdown. Of how Shane has changed in twenty years, the actor explained "He's no longer the loose cannon he once was – Shane believes in family above all else, and would do anything for his loved ones."

Karl Kennedy

Karl Kennedy, played by Alan Fletcher, made his first appearance on 20 September 1994. The character and his family were created by the storyliners, who wanted to bring the show back to its roots, as most of the houses on Ramsay Street were filled with misfits and distant relatives. Karl was introduced as a General Practitioner, which gave him immediate links with the other characters. Alan Fletcher previously appeared in the show as mechanic Greg Cooper for three weeks in 1987. When the role of Karl became available, Fletcher auditioned in the same way as he had for Greg. Fletcher admitted that when he joined the show again he thought he would only be there for a year. Karl initially ran his own surgery in the Lassiter's Complex. He and his wife Susan (Jackie Woodburne) were childhood sweethearts. Fletcher won Best Daytime Star at the 2016 Inside Soap Awards.

Billy Kennedy

Billy Kennedy, played by Jesse Spencer, made his first appearance on 27 September 1994. The character was introduced along with his mother, father and two older siblings by the show's storyliners, who wanted to take the show back to its roots, as it seemed that all the houses on Ramsay Street were populated with misfits and distant relatives. Spencer originally auditioned for the role of Brett Stark, but he was told that he was too young. The following year, he successfully auditioned for the role of Billy. Billy was described as being "sensitive" and "not as academically gifted as sister Libby" by Tony Johnston author of Neighbours: 20 years of Ramsay Street. Billy often gets into trouble with his best friend Toadfish Rebecchi (Ryan Moloney). For his portrayal of Billy, Spencer received nominations for the Logie Award for Most Popular Actor in 1998 and 1999.

Susan Kennedy

Susan Kennedy, played by Jackie Woodburne, made her first appearance on 3 October 1994. The character was introduced along with her husband and three teenage children by storyliners in an effort to bring the show back to its roots, as it seemed that all the houses on Ramsay Street were populated with misfits and distant relatives. Actress Ailsa Piper was initially considered for the role of Susan, before she was cast as Ruth Wilkinson. Woodburne received the role, and later revealed that she only intended to play the part for twelve months, but she soon fell in love with the show. Susan was given a teaching job at the local high school, giving her close links with the other characters. On her arrival, Susan was described as being good natured and more open-minded than her husband Karl Kennedy (Alan Fletcher).

Malcolm Kennedy

Malcolm Kennedy, played by Benjamin McNair, made his first appearance on 3 October 1994. The character was introduced along with his parents and two younger siblings by storyliners, who wanted a "solid" family, as they felt that the houses on Ramsay Street were populated with misfits and distant relatives. After being cast as Malcolm, McNair relocated from his home in Sydney to Melbourne, where the show is filmed. He admitted that he had never watched Neighbours before joining the cast. Malcolm is the eldest of the Kennedy siblings. He is an athlete, and enjoys being in charge. He quickly gets involved in Ramsay Street "shenanigans". Shortly after his arrival, producers plotted a Romeo and Juliet style romance between Malcolm and Danni Stark (Eliza Szonert). Caroline Milburn of The Age branded him a "larrikin."

Libby Kennedy

Libby Kennedy, played by Kym Valentine, made her first appearance on 3 October 1994. The character was introduced along with her parents and two brothers by storyliners, who wanted to bring the show back to its roots when it seemed that all the houses on Ramsay Street were populated with misfits and distant relatives. After being cast as Libby, Valentine relocated from Sydney to Melbourne, where the studios are located, when she was 17 years old. Josephine Monroe, author of Neighbours; The First 10 Years, described Libby as an opinionated girl, who is willing to make a stand on "any and every issue." She is a communist and her political views often frustrate her father, Karl Kennedy (Alan Fletcher). Valentine enjoyed playing Libby's humorous and quirky personality traits. Libby was voted viewer's third favourite character in a 2002 poll run by Newsround.

Bianca Zanotti

Bianca Zanotti, played by Annie Gagliardi, made her first appearance on 11 November 1994. Bianca was introduced as a teen runaway, who is found sleeping rough in Marlene Kratz's (Moya O'Sullivan) bric-a-brac shop. She befriends Marlene and her nephew Sam Kratz (Richard Grieve), and she tells them that she is "an ex-offender who is trying to go straight". When Bianca says that she cannot find anywhere to live or work, Sam allows her to stay at the shop. Gagliardi found playing a teen runaway made her a "cult figure" among young street children in St Kilda, who often recognised her and spoke to her as if she was one of them. 

When Bianca and Marlene find some jewels among some of the stock in the shop, Bianca takes them to be valued and is accused of being in possession of stolen goods. Gagliardi told Inside Soap's Victoria Ross that her character would have a tough time proving her innocence, explaining "Everyone seems to turn against her, especially Cheryl who thinks that Bianca is real big trouble. This new run-in with the police makes her realise how difficult it will be to prove to people that her tearaway days are behind her." Bianca is also concerned that the police will not believe her because she has spent time in a detention centre. Although Marlene and Sam stand by her, Bianca decides to run away. Gagliardi said Bianca "feels terrible" about leaving the only people who have ever had faith in her, but she would not be gone for long. Of Bianca's time in the show, David Banks of The People observed, "Call her the tiddler who got away if you like, but Bianca's departure set some kind of record for a woman from Neighbours. No sex, no seductions, no real romance – just a solitary kiss from Brett Stark makes her the first nubile maid to escape from Ramsay Street without so much as a grope to remember the boys by."

After she is discovered sleeping in the bric-a-brac shop by Sam Kratz and Serendipity Gottlieb (Raelee Hill), Bianca tells them that she was thrown out of her house by her stepfather. She also tells them that she served time in a detention centre after she stole a car with some friends. Bianca is initially wary of Sam, and she reveals that she has been harassed by guys in the past. Sam asks Bianca to help him out with his handyman business. Sam's grandmother Marlene takes pity on Bianca, and invites her to move in with her. Bianca befriends Malcolm Kennedy (Benjamin McNair). When he tries to make advances towards her during a date, she punches him and he invents a story that he fended off muggers that attacked them. An incensed Bianca tells the truth, which humiliates Malcolm. Bianca becomes close with Brett Stark (Brett Blewitt) who helps her fill out an application for college. When Bianca's mother,  Claudia Marcusani (Helen Trenos) reappears in her life, things are initially frosty between them, but Bianca decides to give her mother another chance and move back home with her. Before she leaves, Bianca gives Brett a kiss and a passionflower, asking him to keep it alive for her.

Ling Mai Chan

Ling Mai Chan, played by Khym Lam, made her first appearance on 23 November 1994. Ling Mai is Lou Carpenter's (Tom Oliver) daughter. Oliver told the show's producers that he believed Lou was old enough to have been conscripted for the Vietnam War and could have fathered a child over there. However, a similar storyline had already been done with Jim Robinson (Alan Dale), so the producers suggested something else instead. Lou learns he fathered a daughter after a brief relationship when he was twenty-one. An Inside Soap columnist observed, "the fruit of Lou's affair was a beautiful daughter Mai Ling who has now grown up to be a sophisticated university tutor." Lou is surprised when Ling Mai gets in contact and he arranges to meet her in secret, which leads his partner Cheryl Stark (Caroline Gillmer) to think he is having an affair. After a month, Ling Mai makes "shock announcement" that she is returning home, after her partner proposes. Lou is forced to say "a miserable farewell" to his daughter, leaving Cheryl to console him. The character was referenced in 2013, when Lou is persuaded to get back in contact with her. After Lou sends Ling Mai an email, she asks him to visit her in Cambodia. The storyline was inspired by Oliver's real life trip to the country.

Lou Carpenter receives a letter from Ling Mai informing him that she is his daughter, and wants to meet him. Lou initially keeps Ling Mai a secret from his partner Cheryl, who follows him one day and sees him meeting with Ling Mai. Cheryl assumes Lou is having an affair with Ling Mai, until Lou tells her that Ling Mai is his daughter. Cheryl invites Ling Mai to dinner, and she befriends Cheryl's son Brett Stark (Brett Blewitt). Lou shows her his used car business and offers a car to make up for the birthdays he has missed. Lou and Cheryl's relationship becomes strained and Lou moves in with his daughter. Ling Mai tries to talk to Cheryl, before she and Cheryl's mother Marlene Kratz (Moya O'Sullivan) get the couple to reconcile.

Lou pays for Ling Mai's university funding, and tries to get her a show at the local radio station. He also takes her to the beach, so he can teach her how to swim. Ling Mai later tells Lou that she is leaving Australia, as her boyfriend, Bin, has come over from Hong Kong and has proposed to her. Lou thanks her for getting in touch and meeting him. On Boxing Day 2003, Lou receives a congratulatory telegram from Ling Mai for his wedding to Trixie Tucker (Wendy Stapleton). He visits her the following year, while he is in Hong Kong helping Trixie promote a production of Hello Dolly! she is starring in. Nine years later, Lou decides to get back in contact with Ling Mai and learns she is living and working for a charity in Cambodia. He flies out to spend a few months with her.

Others

References

Bibliography

External links
 Characters and cast at the Official Neighbours website
 Characters and cast at the Internet Movie Database
 Shane Rebecchi at the Official Neighbours website

1994
, Neighbours